Sudeva Delhi Football Club is an Indian professional football club based in Delhi, that competes in I-League, the second tier of Indian football league system. Founded as Sudeva Moonlight FC in 2014, the club is affiliated with Football Delhi, and also participate in Delhi Premier League. Sudeva joined I-League in the 2020–21 season and became the first club from the capital to do so.

History

The beginning
Sudeva is an organization which was started in 2014 by two young entrepreneurs, Anuj Gupta, a solicitor in England and Vijay Hakari, an environmentalist, sharing a common passion for raising the standards of football training in the country. The organization runs grassroots programs for potential talent, starting from the age of 9, right up to the senior level.

As Sudeva Moonlight
In 2016, Sudeva acquired Moonlight FC, a Delhi-based club playing in the DSA Senior Division (now known as Football Delhi Senior Division League), and having won the league twice in 1985 and 1990. The club had submitted its bid in 2016 to center into the I-League, but it eventually failed through. Sudeva Moonlight debuted in I-League 2nd Division during the 2016–17 season, and appointed Carlton Chapman as head coach. In 2018, Sudeva acquired Sudeva Olimpic Residential Academy, a club that currently competes in the Spanish Tercera Division, and became the first club in the history of Indian football to acquire a European club.

In 2018, they participated in J&K Invitational Cup.

As Sudeva Delhi
In June 2020, All India Football Federation (AIFF) invited bids for a new team to join the I-League. Sudeva was one of three football clubs that submitted the bid documents and on August 12, 2020, AIFF announced that Sudeva would take part in the 2020–21 I-League season, after winning the bid for direct entry.

Sudeva Delhi was launched by Delhi Deputy Chief Minister Manish Sisodia on November 27, 2020.

Ahead of the 2020–21 I-League season, Sudeva Delhi appointed Chencho Dorji as their head coach. Dorji is the first Bhutanese coach at the helm of any club in the history of the I-League.
{{Cquote|It is a great honour to be part of the I-League. I really thank the president and the vice-president for believing in me and deciding to give the huge responsibility. lf you do well, you will survive and I am very excited about this challenge. As with every head coach, I also want to win. l want to win all the matches, but that does not happen in football.|source=Chencho Dorji, after becoming the head coach of Sudeva Delhi FC.|Cquote}}

The first club from the national capital to play in the I-League, Sudeva Delhi FC have opted for an all-Indian squad in their first season and the concept was supported by coach Dorji: "The message was always clear that we will go with an all-Indian squad."

The club began their very first top flight competitive season on 9 January with a match against Mohammedan SC, which ended as their 1–0 loss. After struggling in lots of matches, they managed to win against teams like Chennai City FC, NEROCA and Indian Arrows. They managed to get 18 points from 14 games, which includes five wins, six losses and there draws and finished in eighth position of the league table.

Sudeva began their 2021–22 season with 2021 Durand Cup in Kolkata, and bowed out of the tournament from group stages. In 2021–22 I-League, after moving to relegation stage, the club ended their campaign in eleventh position. After Dorji's departure, the club was managed by Mehrajuddin Wadoo till September 2022.

In September 2022, the club roped in Japanese manager Atsushi Nakamura as new head coach. The club struggled a lot in 2022–23 season, and relegated from I-League, alongside Kenkre.

Kit manufacturers and shirt sponsors

Stadium

Ambedkar Stadium, located in Delhi, is the home ground of Sudeva Delhi.My aim is to make Sudeva FC the Ajax of Indian Football, says Anuj Gupta . Sudeva.in. Retrieved 19 April 2021. Since 2022, the club also plays some of their home matches of I-League at Chhatrasal Stadium.

In previous editions of I-League, due to COVID-19 pandemic in India, played league games in centralized venues in West Bengal.

Players
First-team squad

Personnel
Current technical staff

Managerial recordInformation correct after match played on 5 March 2022. Only competitive matches are counted.Team records
Season by season

 Honours 
 Cup 
Hot Weather Football Championship
Champions (1): 2019

Notable players

The following Sudeva Delhi players have been capped at senior/youth international level'' for their respective countries. Years in brackets indicate their spells at the club.

  Peterson Joseph (2016–2017)
  Daneil Cyrus (2022)
  Shavkati Khotam (2023–)

Affiliated club(s) 
The following clubs are currently affiliated with Sudeva Delhi FC:
  CD Olímpic de Xàtiva (2018–present)
  Shonan Bellmare (2022–present)

Other departments

Football (youth men's) 
Sudeva Delhi is known for running football academics, grassroot developments, full-fledged residential facilities, through the formation of Sudeva Sports Village in Delhi. Since the inception of youth section, the club has been operating its U13, U15, U19 teams, and participating in various age-group leagues conducted by both the Football Delhi (FD) and AIFF.

Club's U17 team for the first time, took part in the 2022–23 U-17 Youth Cup in January 2023, after going through the qualification stages. In semi-finals, they defeated Chennaiyin. In final on 31 January, the club finished as runner-up, after a 2–0 defeat to Classic FA.

Honours
JSW U-13 Youth Cup
Champions (1): 2022
FD U-18 Youth League
Champions (1): 2022–23
Hero U-17 Youth League
Runners-up (1): 2022–23
FD U-13 Youth League
Champions (1): 2022–23
FD U-15 Youth League
Champions (1): 2022–23

Futsal

The futsal section of Sudeva Delhi has participated in the inaugural edition of AIFF Futsal Club Championship under coaching of Prakhar Agarwal, in which they failed to reach the knock-out stages.

See also
 List of football clubs in Delhi
 Sport in Delhi

References

External links

Sudeva Delhi FC at Global Sports Archive

 Sudeva Delhi FC at Soccerway
Sudeva Delhi FC at FBref
Sudeva Delhi FC at the-aiff.com
Sudeva Delhi FC at scorebing.com

 
Football clubs in Delhi
I-League clubs
I-League 2nd Division clubs
2014 establishments in Delhi
Association football clubs established in 2014